José Barbosa (1 April 1929 in San Juan, Puerto Rico – 14 February 2015 in Palm Harbor, Florida) was a Puerto Rican pole vaulter who competed in the 1948 Summer Olympics.

References

1929 births
2015 deaths
Puerto Rican male pole vaulters
Olympic track and field athletes of Puerto Rico
Athletes (track and field) at the 1948 Summer Olympics
Central American and Caribbean Games gold medalists for Puerto Rico
Competitors at the 1954 Central American and Caribbean Games
Central American and Caribbean Games medalists in athletics
20th-century Puerto Rican people